Casimir Schmidt (born ) is a Dutch male artistic gymnast and part of the national team. He won the silver medal in the men's vault event at the 2015 European Games in Baku. He participated at the 2013 World Artistic Gymnastics Championships and 2015 World Artistic Gymnastics Championships in Glasgow.

References

1995 births
Living people
Dutch male artistic gymnasts
European Games medalists in gymnastics
European Games silver medalists for the Netherlands
Gymnasts at the 2015 European Games
People from Haarlemmermeer
Sportspeople from North Holland